Sinuber sculptum is a species of predatory sea snail, a marine gastropod mollusk in the family Naticidae, the moon snails.

Distribution

Description 
The maximum recorded shell length is 9.5 mm.

Habitat 
Minimum recorded depth is 94 m. Maximum recorded depth is 855 m.

References

Naticidae
Gastropods described in 1878